Petrodvortsovy District is a district of the federal city of St. Petersburg, Russia. As of the 2010 Census, its population: was 128,156; up from 77,542 recorded in the 2002 Census.

Municipal divisions

Petrodvortsovy District comprises two municipal towns (Lomonosov and Petergof) and one municipal settlement (Strelna).

References

Notes

Sources